Tebela (Geʽez: ጠበላ) or (Wolaita: Xabala) is a city in Wolaita, Ethiopia. Tebela is an administrative capital of Humbo woreda district of Wolayita Zone. Tebela is located about 345 km away from Addis Ababa to the south. And also, Tebela is located 20 km, South from Sodo, the capital of Wolayita Zone. The coordinate point of the town in map is 6°42′24″N 37°46′10″E. The amenities in the town are; 24 hours electricity, pure public water, banks, primary and secondary schools, postal service, telecommunications services health centre, private clinics, drugs store, public market, public road light around high ways, internal and town crossing asphalt roads and others.

Demographics 
Tebela is one of densely populated areas in Southern Nations Nationalities and Peoples Region. Total population of the town as conducted by central statistical agency of Ethiopia in 2020 is 16,019.

References 

Wolayita
Cities and towns in Wolayita Zone
Populated places in the Southern Nations, Nationalities, and Peoples' Region